Clitorin is a natural product that is a  kaempferol glycoside.

It has been found in Clitoria ternatea, Saxifraga cuneifolia, Diospyros rhombifolia and Acalypha indica.

Dried papaya leaf juice contains about 0.7% clitorin.

References

Kaempferol glycosides